Liu To is the area around the valley in the midwest of Tsing Yi Island. There is a stream in the valley watering the narrow band of agricultural fields of Liu To Village. Its water formerly filled the Tsing Yi Lagoon and nurtured the rice paddies around the lagoon but now is just water flowing in the underground nullah to the Rambler Channel. The valley has occasionally been referred to as the Liu To Valley and the surrounding hills as Liu To Hill.

The Mount Haven private housing estate sits deep in the valley, while the Cheung Wang Estate and the Cheung Hang Estate stand on the surrounding hills to the north. Liu To Bridge, part of Tsing Yi West Road, spans the valley.

The Tsing Yi Nature Trail runs over the hills at the back of the valley.

Tsing Yi
Valleys of Hong Kong